Stefan Boleslaw Poradowski (born August 16, 1902 in Wloclawek, died. July 9, 1967 in Poznań) was a Polish composer.

Life 
Poradowski received his musical education in Wloclawek at P. Bojakowskiego, then at the Conservatory of Music in Bydgoszcz Winterfeld. From 1922 - 1926 he studied in Poznan at the National Conservatory of Music where he studied composition and theory (Henryk Opieński) and the University (the right and musicology). Complementary studies in composition took place in Berlin with Emil Reznicek. He worked as a teacher of violin playing and lecturing on theoretical subjects in Poznan and Leszno, and in 1930 he became professor of theory and composition, as well as a special chamber orchestra director in the Poznan Conservatory. Before the war, he also lectured at the Municipal Conservatory of Music in Bydgoszcz (1935 - 1939), conducted the chamber orchestra and choir of the Society of Music "Harmony" in Poznań (1930 - 1939) and operated recenzencką. In 1939 he was arrested by the Germans and then taken to Apt, Poland, where he worked as an organist and choral conductor.

In 1945, he again taught a special class of theory and composition at the State Music Academy in Poznan, where he was also Vice-rector and Dean of the Faculty of Composition, Theory and Conducting. In 1958 he became associate professor. At the same time, he led the composition class at the State Higher School of Music in Wroclaw (in 1955), discussed the Poznan Philharmonic concert programs (1946 - 1956), and organized festivals and competitions nationwide. He was also a well-known artist, photographer, and longtime president of the Poznan branch of the Union of Polish Art Photographers.

The composer's wife was Wanda Lewandowska, the daughter of well-known druggist Louis Lewandowski.

Stefan Boleslaw Poradowski died on 9 July 1967 in Poznan. He lies in the Crypt of the Meritorious Wielkopolska in the Church of St. Adalbert.

Awards
He received many awards, including: Artistic Award of Poznań (1947), the Gold Cross of Merit (1955), Knight's Cross of the Order of Polish Rebirth (1964), Medal of Honour of the City of Poznan (1964) and Award of Degree of the Ministry of Culture and Arts ( 1966).

Literary contributions
He wrote several textbooks on the theory of music, including harmony Science (1931), Musical Instruments (1938), diatonic harmonic modulations (1939), The Fugue (1962), Acoustics for Musicians (1964), The Art of Writing canons (1965).

Discography
Poradowski has over 130 works, including:

Symphonic Music
Symphonies (I - VIII)
Poznan City Hall symphonic poem, Op. 52 No. 1
Suites for popular topics: Dyngus Kuyavia and Wedding Scenes
Violin Concerto, Op. 70
Contrabass concerto, Op. 26
Concerto for flute, harp and strings, Op. 59 No. 1

Chamber Music
Antique Suite for String Orchestra, Op. 6
String quartets
String trio

Instrumental solo pieces
Piano:
Prelude and Fugue, Op. 8, No. 1
Memories Sonata, Op. 41
Classical Sonatina No. I and II
Violin:
Sonata, Op. 5
Nocturne, Op. 57
Preludium and Toccata, Op. 68
Mazurka for viola, Op. 24
Romance for Double Bass
Prelude for organ

Works for the stage
Flames opera, Op. 66 No. 1

Vocal Music
Cantata: The Triumph, Song of the spring, Horse Światowida, Poznan Rhapsody, Song of the Vistula
Redemption Oratorio
Choral works for mixed choir and male choir

Solo songs
Courtship
Lament of the Virgin Mary
Song of the Night
Song of Our Lady of Loretto

External links
http://www.culture.pl/pl/culture/artykuly/os_poradowski_stefan_boleslaw
http://polmic.com/index.php?option=com_mwosoby&Itemid=4&id=749&view=czlowie

1902 births
1967 deaths
20th-century composers
Polish composers
People from Włocławek